Ricky Junior Otto (born 9 November 1967) is an English former footballer.

Born in the London Borough of Hackney, he began his career with amateur side Haringey Borough, where his performances in midfield caught the eye of Leyton Orient. They signed him in 1990. His subsequent performances there alerted Southend United manager Barry Fry, who paid £100,000 to bring him to Roots Hall in 1993.

Otto followed Fry to Birmingham City for £800,000 in 1994 but never really settled at the club, having spells on loan at Charlton Athletic, Peterborough United and Notts County. He was however part of the side that won the 1995 Football League Trophy Final and set up the winning goal for Paul Tait. He has the conspicuous record of having scored both goals in a 1–1 draw on his debut against Cambridge United. Released in 1998, he had a spell in non-League football before signing for Rhyl in 2002.

After retiring from football, Otto trained and worked as a probation officer, and went on to found a consultancy working with offenders and those at risk of offending. He became a Christian, and took a degree in theology.

References

External links

Profile on Sporting Heroes

Living people
1967 births
English footballers
Association football midfielders
Haringey Borough F.C. players
Leyton Orient F.C. players
Southend United F.C. players
Birmingham City F.C. players
Charlton Athletic F.C. players
Peterborough United F.C. players
Notts County F.C. players
Halesowen Town F.C. players
Rhyl F.C. players
Romulus F.C. players
English Football League players
Cymru Premier players
Footballers from the London Borough of Hackney